Below is a sortable list of compositions by Gustav Holst.  The works are categorized by genre, H. catalogue number (A Thematic Catalogue of Gustav Holst's Music by Imogen Holst, London, Faber Music Ltd., 1974), opus number, date of composition and title.

Sources
 Holst, Imogen (1974). A Thematic Catalogue of Gustav Holst's Music, London: Faber Music Ltd.

References

External links
 Gustav Holst at Pytheas Center for Contemporary Music

 
Holst, Gustav